Ted Brown is an American former Negro league shortstop who played in the 1940s.

Brown played for the Baltimore Elite Giants in 1943. In five recorded games, he posted six hits in 19 plate appearances.

References

External links
 and Seamheads

Year of birth missing
Place of birth missing
Baltimore Elite Giants players
Baseball shortstops